John Anthony Nicholson (November 17, 1827 – November 4, 1906) was an American lawyer and politician from Dover, in Kent County, Delaware. He was a member of the Democratic Party, who served as U. S. Representative from Delaware.

Early life and family
He was born in Laurel, Delaware, and was the son of Jacob Cannon Nicholson and Susannah Fauntleroy Quarles Nicholson. He began preparatory studies in Laurel, completing them at a seminary in Nelson County, Virginia, possibly the Presbyterian school at Lynchburg. After four years study, in 1847 he graduated from Dickinson College in Carlisle, Pennsylvania. He married Angelica Killeen Reed in August 1848 and John Reed Nicholson was one of their children.

Professional and political career
Nicholson began his career as briefly the superintendent of the free schools of Kent County in 1851. At the same time he studied law with Martin W. Bates in Dover, was admitted to the Delaware Bar in 1850, and began a law practice in Dover. In addition he served as brigadier general of militia in Kent County in 1861. In 1864 he defeated the Republican and Ultimate Unionist candidate Nathaniel Smithers, another Dickinson graduate, and was ultimately elected as a Democrat to the 39th and 40th Congress, serving from March 4, 1865 to March 3, 1869. During the first term he was on the Committee of Elections and in the second the Appropriations Committee. He was not a candidate for renomination in 1868 and continued his practice of the law.

Death and legacy
Nicholson died at Dover and is buried there in the Old Presbyterian Cemetery, on the grounds of the Delaware State Museum. His son, John Reed Nicholson was the chancellor of Delaware between 1895 and 1909.

His home, Wheel of Fortune, was added to the National Register of Historic Places in 1973.

Almanac
Elections are held the first Tuesday after November 1. U.S. Representatives took office March 4 and have a two-year term.

References

External links
Biographical Directory of the United States Congress 
Delaware’s Members of Congress 

The Political Graveyard
Biography at Dickinson.edu

1827 births
1906 deaths
People from Dover, Delaware
Delaware lawyers
Dickinson College alumni
Burials in Dover, Delaware
Democratic Party members of the United States House of Representatives from Delaware
19th-century American politicians
People from Laurel, Delaware